Standing Up Straight is the second studio album by English post-punk band The Wolfgang Press. It was released on 1 May 1986, through record label 4AD.

Background 

"I Am the Crime" features vocals by Cocteau Twins vocalist and label-mate Elizabeth Fraser.

Critical reception 
AllMusic called Standing Up Straight "a challenging, even punishing album, but a rewarding one as well." Trouser Press wrote that "musically, Standing Up Straight is as challenging and inventive as the band’s other work, adding industrial and classical instrumentation to the creative arsenal."

Track listing

Personnel 

 The Wolfgang Press – production, sleeve art direction

 Additional personnel

 Gini Ball – violin on "Dig a Hole" and "I Am the Crime", viola on "I Am the Crime"
 John Fryer – marimba on "Ghost", percussion on "Rotten Fodder", production, programming, engineering
 Elizabeth Fraser – vocals (additional) on "I Am the Crime"
 Martin McGarrick – cello on "I Am the Crime"

 Technical

 23 Envelope – sleeve design, typography and photography
 Chris Bigg – sleeve typography
 Ruth Rowland – sleeve typography

References

External links 

 

1986 albums
The Wolfgang Press albums